Edwina Adaha Cochrane Benner (August 1, 1885 – May 14, 1955) was the mayor of Sunnyvale, California, from 1924 to 1926 and again from 1937 to 1938. She served as councilmember from 1920 until 1948. Commonly described as the first female mayor in California, she was actually the second, after Ellen French Aldrich of Sawtelle, California—though Sawtelle had already been annexed by the city of Los Angeles by the time Benner was appointed mayor.

Buildings 

In 1954, Sunnyvale School District opened the Edwina Benner Intermediate school, named in her honor. In 2017, affordable housing developer MidPen Housing broke ground on a new 66 unit affordable housing project in Sunnyvale, the Edwina Benner Plaza.

References

1885 births
1955 deaths
People from Sunnyvale, California
Politics of the San Francisco Bay Area
Government of Santa Clara County, California
Political history of the San Francisco Bay Area
20th-century American women politicians
20th-century American politicians
Women mayors of places in California
Mayors of places in California